Terman is an eastern European surname.

It may also refer to:

People
 Douglas Terman (author; born 1933), military novelist
 Frederick Terman (engineer; 1900-1982), Provost of Stanford University, credited with establishing Silicon Valley
 Lewis Terman, (cognitive psychologist; 1877-1956), IQ testing pioneer, father of Frederick Terman
 Michael Terman (American psychology professor and chronobiologist)

Places
 Terman, Iran, a village in Fars Province
 Terman Middle School in Palo Alto, California